The Ireland national rugby union team represents the island of Ireland in international rugby union and plays in the Six Nations Championship and Rugby World Cup.

Thomas Gisborne Gordon, who played for Ireland between 1877–78, is the only one handed player to have competed in international rugby of either code.

Career

Most caps
Seven current or retired members of the Ireland team have earned 100 or more test caps. Ireland's all-time caps leader is Brian O'Driscoll with 133. The active player with the most caps is Cian Healy with 123 caps, followed by Johnny Sexton with 113 caps.

These figures do not include caps for the Lions. When those are included, O'Driscoll has 141 international caps. O'Gara has 130, Sexton has 119, and O'Connell has 115.

Last updated: Ireland vs England, 18 March 2023. Statistics include officially capped matches only.

Most tries
Ireland's record try scorer is Brian O'Driscoll, who notched 46 career tries, which ranks him eighth in international tries.

Last updated: Ireland vs England, 18 March 2023. Statistics include officially capped matches only.

Most points
Ronan O'Gara holds the Ireland record for test points with 1,083, placing him fifth all-time in international rugby union.
Johnny Sexton is the highest points scorers in the Six Nations with 566 points, followed by Ronan O'Gara with 557.

Last updated: Ireland vs England, 18 March 2023. Statistics include officially capped matches only.

Most matches as captain
Brian O'Driscoll is third on the all-time list for test matches as captain. He has captained Ireland 83 times and the Lions once.

Last updated: Ireland vs England, 18 March 2023. Statistics include officially capped matches only.

Single match

Most points in a match

Last updated: Scotland vs Ireland, 12 March 2023. Statistics include officially capped matches only.

Most tries in a match

Last updated: Ireland vs England, 18 March 2023. Statistics include officially capped matches only.

Player age

Youngest players

Last updated: Ireland vs England, 18 March 2023. Statistics include officially capped matches only.

Oldest players

Last updated: Ireland vs England, 18 March 2023. Statistics include officially capped matches only.

Team margins

Biggest winning margin

Last updated: Ireland vs England, 18 March 2023. Statistics include officially capped matches only.

Biggest losing margin

Last updated: Ireland vs England, 18 March 2023. Statistics include officially capped matches only.

References

Ireland
records